Lacey Heward is an American para-alpine skier. She represented the United States at the 2002 Winter Paralympics and at the 2006 Winter Paralympics in alpine skiing.

In 2002 she won two bronze medals: in the Women's Giant Slalom LW10-11 event and in the Women's Super-G LW10-12 event.

Achievements

References 

Living people
Year of birth missing (living people)
Place of birth missing (living people)
Paralympic alpine skiers of the United States
American female alpine skiers
Alpine skiers at the 2002 Winter Paralympics
Alpine skiers at the 2006 Winter Paralympics
Medalists at the 2002 Winter Paralympics
Paralympic bronze medalists for the United States
Paralympic medalists in alpine skiing
21st-century American women